The 1970–71 Delaware Fightin' Blue Hens women's basketball team represented the University of Delaware during the 1970–71 school year. This marked the second year of the program as a sanctioned sport by the university. Women's basketball, field hockey, and swimming had been approved on an experimental two-year basis in early 1969. This was also the first year of varsity coaching for head coach Mary Ann Hitchens, who had led the 1969-70 freshman women's team to an undefeated 5–0 record the prior season.

Roster

Schedule

|-
!colspan=9 style=| Non-conference regular season

|-
!colspan=9 style=| Mid Atlantic Regional Women's Intercollegiate Basketball Tournament

References

Delaware Fightin' Blue Hens women's basketball seasons